The 1961 San Diego State Aztecs football team represented San Diego State College during the 1961 NCAA College Division football season.

San Diego State competed in the California Collegiate Athletic Association (CCAA). The team was led by head coach Don Coryell, in his first year, and played home games at Aztec Bowl. They finished the season with seven wins, two losses, and one tie (7–2–1, 2–2–1 CCAA). This was a big turnaround from the previous year when they had won only a single game.

Schedule

Team players in the NFL/AFL
No San Diego State players were selected in the 1962 NFL Draft or 1962 AFL Draft.

Team awards

Notes

References

San Diego State
San Diego State Aztecs football seasons
San Diego State Aztecs football